Jacques Étienne Victor Arago (6 March 1790 – 27 November 1855) was a French writer, artist and explorer, author of a Voyage Round the World.

Biography

Jacques was born in Estagel, Pyrénées-Orientales. He was the brother of François Arago (1786–1853), a scientist and politician, the most famous of the six Arago brothers. His parents were François Bonaventure Arago (1754–1814) and Marie Arago (1755–1845). His four other brothers were Jean Arago (1788–1836), a general in the Mexican army; Victor Arago (1792-1867), a military in France; Joseph Arago (1796-1860), also a military in France and Mexico, Étienne Arago (1802–1892), a writer and politician.

Jacques Arago joined Louis de Freycinet as an artist when he left Toulon in 1817 in command of a scientific voyage around the world aboard the corvette Uranie. The expedition returned in 1820 and Arago was the first to publish an account, the Promenade autour du monde, in the form of letters to a friend named Battle, in 1822. An English translation followed in 1823.  He continued to expand on his adventures in further editions and in the late 1830s published a much longer version under the title Souvenirs d'un Aveugle (Memoirs of a Blind Man). There are significant differences from the Promenade and the reliability is in doubt. Having been given a challenge many years later by a lady at a social dinner, he then published Voyage autour du monde, sans la lettre A (Voyage around the world, without the letter A), later known as Curieux voyage autour du monde, in 1853, where he tells of his round trip lipogrammatically, that is, without once using the letter "A". The lady replied with a letter without the letter C.

On the Freycinet expedition to Hawaii in 1819, Arago "showed Riouriou a Camera obscura," the first such ever seen in the Hawaiian islands.

Although Arago lost his sight in 1837, he went on traveling  and writing for the theater.

He died in Rio de Janeiro, Brazil. Over forty of his drawings were donated to the Honolulu Museum of Art by Frances Damon Holt.

Works 
 1822 : Promenade autour du monde pendant les années 1817, 1818, 1819 et 1820, sur les corvettes du Roi L'Uranie et La Physicienne, commandées par M. Freycinet

Plays 
 1825 : Le Compagnon d'infortune ou les Prisonniers, by Emmanuel Théaulon and Jacques Arago
 1832 : Le Duc de Reichstadt, by Louis Lurine and Jacques Arago
 1834 : Les Papillotes, by Jacques-François Ancelot and Jacques Arago
 1834 : Un noviciat diplomatique
 1836 : Le Cadet de Gascogne, by Léon Buquet and Jacques Arago
 1837 : Un mois à Naples, by Duplessy and Jacques Arago
 1838 : Mademoiselle d’Alvigny, lieutenant de dragons
 1840 : Le Camélia, by Édouard Gouin and Jacques Arago
 1840 : L’Éclat de rire, by Alexandre Martin and Jacques Arago

Essays 

 1824 : Collection de proverbes et bons-mots
 1824 : Aux jeunes poètes de l'époque
 1827 : Le Fond du sac ou les Rognures de la censure
 1829 : Promenades historiques, philosophiques et pittoresques dans le département de la Gironde

Gallery

See also

 François Arago
 Circumnavigation
 European and American voyages of scientific exploration

References

External links
 
 

1790 births
1855 deaths
People from Pyrénées-Orientales
19th-century French writers
Writers from Occitania (administrative region)
French bird artists
French illustrators
French male writers
19th-century French male writers